Sara Del Carmen Bello Herrera (born 17 December 1987) (Las Tablas, Los Santos) is beauty pageant titleholder from Panama winner of the Panamá Intercontinental 2013, April 2013 for Miss Intercontinental 2013, reina del carnaval internacional de Calle Abajo de Las Tablas 2007, Los Santos-Panamá.

Queen of the Las Tablas carnival 2007
Sara won her first beauty contest in early 2007 when she became queen of the Las Tablas carnival.

Miss Panamá 2013

Bello is 5 ft 1⁄2 in (1.66 m) tall, and competed in the national beauty pageant Miss Panamá 2013. She represented the state of Los Santos.

Miss Intercontinental 2013
She represented Panamá at the Miss Intercontinental 2013 pageant in Germany in November 2013 where she place in the Top 15 and won the National Costume.

See also
 Carolina Brid
 Virginia Hernández
 Miss Panamá 2013

References

External links
 Miss Panama Official Web Page

1986 births
Living people
Panamanian beauty pageant winners
Panamanian female models
Señorita Panamá